This is a list of the tallest buildings in South Bend by roof height. The tallest has been the 25-story Liberty Tower, since its completion in 1971. Eighteen total structures are approximately one hundred feet tall. The Four Winds Casino Hotel has been topped out, but has not yet been fully completed.

List

References

Buildings and structures in South Bend, Indiana
South Bend